Selfie King is a 2020 Nepali film, directed by Bishal Sapkota. The film is produced by Dinesh Raut, and Shuvash Thapa under the banner of Picture Frame, and Shuvash Thapa Productions. The film features Bipin Karki in the lead role as Gopal, who is an actor and plays Selfie King in the TV show Selfie King. The film stars Bipin Karki, Laxmi Bardewa, Abhay Baral, and Bhuwan Chand.

Cast 
 Bipin Karki as Gopal
 Laxmi Bardewa as Gopal's wife
 Abhay Baral
 Bhuwan Chand as Gopal's mother
 Lokmani Sapkota as Gopal's father
 Keki Adhikari as a guest appearance

Release

Critical response 
Abhimanyu Dixit of The Kathmandu Post wrote, "For a debut film, Sapkota has shown audacity and a lot of potential. There are moments that speak for the filmmaker and his love for the medium. For example, the film opens with a shot of a child and closes on a funeral pyre. Here's hoping this film has birthed a space for more young, fresh minds to come ahead and share their stories. We will find perfection along the way". Diwakar Pyakurel of Onlinekhabar wrote, "Selfie King's strength is its story, not the making. It is a ruthless revelation of the tragedy of a comedian's life. The young director needs to improve his presentation skills to quench the Nepali audience's thirst for ‘good movies’". Sunny Mahat of The Annapurna Express wrote, "Written by the director himself, the film's screenplay is extremely loose and the story unconvincing".

References

External links 
 

2020 films
2020s Nepali-language films
Nepalese comedy films
2020 comedy films